The George Caleb Bingham House is a historic house, part of Arrow Rock State Historic Site in Arrow Rock, Missouri, United States. Built in 1837, it was the principal residence of portraitist and landscape painter George Caleb Bingham (1811–79) from 1837 to 1845.  It was declared a National Historic Landmark in 1965.

Description and history
The George Caleb Bingham House is located in the rectangular grid of streets that make up the village of Arrow Rock, near its eastern end at the southeast junction of 1st and High Streets. This property is included in, and forms part of the northern boundary of, the Arrow Rock State Historic Site. The house is a small single-story brick structure, with a three-bay front facade, side gable roof, and chimneys built into the end walls. Its main block has two rooms, and there is a wood-frame addition to the rear.

The house was built in 1837 by George Caleb Bingham, then just married and starting his career. He lived intermittently in this house until 1845, and it is where he developed his signature style of portrait and landscape painting that featured the landscapes and people of the Missouri frontier.

The house underwent a number of significant changes after Bingham moved out. By 1870 it had reportedly been enlarged, and a second story added. In 1926 it was purchased by a preservationist, and it was acquired by the state in 1934. It was then subjected to a restoration that removed all additions and reduced it to its brick core. It was given a more thoughtful restoration in 1964–65, whose goal was to return it to a Federal style appearance, given that there was little documentary evidence of its condition during Bingham's residency.

See also
List of National Historic Landmarks in Missouri
National Register of Historic Places listings in Saline County, Missouri

References

External links

Arrow Rock State Park general information

National Historic Landmarks in Missouri
Houses completed in 1837
Houses in Saline County, Missouri
Houses on the National Register of Historic Places in Missouri
Historic American Buildings Survey in Missouri
Museums in Saline County, Missouri
Historic house museums in Missouri
National Register of Historic Places in Saline County, Missouri
Historic district contributing properties in Missouri